Qaleh Hajji (also Romanized as Qal‘eh Ḩājjī) is a village in Dehmolla Rural District, in the Central District of Shahrud County, Semnan Province, Iran. At the 2006 census, its population was 160, in 53 families.

References 

Populated places in Shahrud County